The Heat–Magic rivalry is an National Basketball Association (NBA) rivalry between the Miami Heat and the Orlando Magic. It is also known as the Sunshine State rivalry since both the Heat and the Magic are based in the state of Florida, similar to the Lakers–Clippers rivalry.

Background
The rivalry started when two teams were expanded into the NBA, both being from Florida which made it a battle for basketball supremacy statewide. Orlando became the first team in Florida to reach the Finals in the 1990s and Miami quickly followed with a strong team of its own after Shaquille O’Neal left Orlando in 1996.

The two teams have met just once in the Playoffs in 1997. It was a surprising five-game series that saw Penny Hardaway put in two of the best individual playoff games in team history with back-to-back 40-point performances. The Heat were the better team and prevailed in the decisive fifth game.

2010–2012: Arrival of LeBron James
In the off season the Heat made headlines nearly every day after it was announced that LeBron James would sign with the club as a free agent. Other teams in the NBA felt slighted and overwhelmed by the amount of coverage the Heat were given.

Magic head coach Stan Van Gundy was one of the people that noticed the “extra” coverage the Heat had received. Earlier in the year of 2010 at a press conference, Van Gundy stated: “I’m surprised there was enough media left for you guys to get here. ESPN is all Heat, all the time.”

The players got involved as well. Marcin Gortat said “Honestly, I’m sick of listening every hour about Miami—Miami that, how great they are, how big they are, what kind of record they gonna have.”

Dwight Howard chimed in by simply stating “We’re trying to take their heads off.” Even upper management got involved in the verbal feud.

Otis Smith, the president of basketball operations for the Orlando Magic was discussing LeBron going to Miami and had this to say: "I was surprised that he went. I thought he was, I guess, more of a competitor.”

Eventually LeBron responded to this comment regarding his competitiveness.
“Orlando, that’s funny that they questioned my competitiveness. I like that. The locker room—we’re going to put a lot of stuff in the locker room...We'll deal with them later."

After the departure of Dwight Howard from the Magic in 2012, the rivalry has softened but still remains heated amongst the organizations and its fans.

One notable moment was in the 2020 NBA All-Star Game when Derrick Jones Jr. of the Heat and Aaron Gordon of the Magic competed against each other in the final round of the Slam Dunk Contest. Gordon had one of the best dunks but former Heat player Dwyane Wade gave him a 9, thus making Jones Jr. the Dunk Contest champion in a controversial decision.

NBA Playoffs

1997 NBA Eastern Conference First Round
 Game 1: Miami Heat 99–64 Orlando Magic 
 Game 2: Miami Heat 104–87 Orlando Magic
 Game 3: Orlando Magic 88–75 Miami Heat
 Game 4: Orlando Magic 99–91 Miami Heat
 Game 5: Miami Heat 91–83 Orlando Magic

Miami Heat win series 3–2.

Common Players
Several players have played for both teams, including:

 Morlon Wiley Magic (–), Heat (–)
 Brian Shaw Heat (–), Magic (–)
 Rony Seikaly Heat (–), Magic (–)
 Danny Schayes Heat (–), Magic (–)
 Kevin Edwards Heat (–), Magic (–)
 Isaac Austin Heat (–), Magic (–)
 Chris Gatling Heat (–, –), Magic (–)
 Rod Strickland Heat (–), Magic (–)
 Shaquille O’Neal Magic (–), Heat (–)
 Michael Doleac Magic (–), Heat (–)
 Keyon Dooling Heat (–), Magic (–)
 Penny Hardaway Magic (–), Heat (–)
 Stan Van Gundy Head Coach Heat (–), Head Coach Magic (–)
 Rafer Alston Heat (–, –), Magic(–)
 Carlos Arroyo Magic (–), Heat (–)
 Jason Williams Heat (–), Magic (–)
 Malik Allen Heat (–), Magic (–)
 Mike Miller Magic (–, Heat (–)
 Juwan Howard Magic (–), Heat (–)
 Quentin Richardson Heat (–), Magic (–)
 Rashard Lewis Magic (–), Heat (–)
 DeAndre Liggins Magic (–), Heat (–)
 Josh McRoberts Magic (–), Heat (–)
 Beno Udrih Magic (–), Heat (–)
 Shabazz Napier Heat (–), Magic (–)
 Ryan Anderson Magic (–), Heat (–)
 James Ennis III Heat (–), Magic (–)
 Victor Oladipo Magic (–), Heat (–present)

See also
List of National Basketball Association rivalries
Lightning–Panthers rivalry
Buccaneers–Dolphins rivalry
Fort Lauderdale–Tampa Bay rivalry
Citrus Series

References

Miami Heat
National Basketball Association rivalries
Orlando Magic
Sports rivalries in Florida
1989 establishments in Florida